Adventures In High Fantasy is a 1981 role-playing game adventure published by Reston Publishing for High Fantasy.

Contents
Adventures In High Fantasy is a book that includes three adventures and a set of miniatures rules for High Fantasy.

Adventures in High Fantasy features four scenarios, including Fortress Ellendar and Moorguard, and also includes "Terra Ash," which describes a lost and buried temple contested by three warring societies, and "Lord of Conquest," a battle scenario that includes miniatures rules.

Publication history
Adventures in High Fantasy was written by Jeffrey C. Dillow and published by Reston Publishing in 1981 as a 208-page hardcover book and as a softcover book.

Reception
Eric Goldberg reviewed Adventures In High Fantasy in Ares Magazine #9. Goldberg commented that "Dillow's imagination is one of his strongest assets, as can be deduced from a quick perusal of his adventure rationales as shown in the Adventures in High Fantasy book."

Lewis Pulsipher reviewed Adventures In High Fantasy in The Space Gamer No. 51. Pulsipher commented that "Take a look at this book if you get a chance, but unless you play High Fantasy or love set-script adventures, you can find more useful material for your game at a comparable price, with more freedom to pick and choose."

References

Fantasy role-playing game adventures
High Fantasy (role-playing game)
Role-playing game supplements introduced in 1981